Veeralipattu is a 2007 Indian Malayalam-language film directed by Kukku Surendran, starring Prithviraj Sukumaran, Murali and Padmapriya.

The film was produced by Sunil Surendran for Open Channel, and was distributed by Maruthi Film Factory. The film was dubbed in Tamil and released as Nagercoil.

Plot 

Hari is depicted as an IT company employee who works in Chennai and is originally from a village in Kerala. His family members include his father, mother, grandfather and sister. Per family custom, his grandfather is a Velichappadu. Hari is in love with Pooja, who is of a royal family. In spite of her parents desire for her to marry a wealthy man from the United States, Pooja falls in love with Hari.

Two years before Hari had moved to Chennai, his grandfather had died and the role of Velichappadu transferred to Hari's father. This change in status led to turmoil in Hari's relationship with his father. Hari's father initially disliked Pooja, but came around. One day, while in the act of Velichappadu at the temple, Hari's father dies due to a brain tumor. In a dream, Hari fears that he might become the family's next Velichappadu. He finally accepts his fate and goes to temple dressed as a Velichappadu, but is relieved to see another man filling that role.

Cast

Soundtrack 
The songs for the film were composed by Viswajith and Rajeev O. N. V.; the lyrics were written by O. N. V. Kurup,  Vayalar Sarath Chandra Varma, Sohan Lal and Prasad Pisharody. The background music was scored by Mohan Sithara.

The soundtrack was distributed by Manorama Music. Songs:

 "Alilayum": Vineeth Sreenivasan, Manjari Babu
 "Alilayum": Manjari Babu
 "Ilaneerin": Anvar Sadath, K. S. Chithra
 "Parayoo NInakkenne (Manorama Bonus Track)": Vidhu Prathap
 "Shankhanaadam (Filler from Aparichitha)": Anwar Sadath, Saraswathy Shankar, Viswajith 
 "Sharadinduvaay Vanna [Manorama Bonus Track]": G. Venugopal
 "Shararaanthalinnu Raavil": Sreenivas

Awards 
 2007 Kerala State Film Award for Second Best Actor - Murali
 2007 Kerala State Film Award – Special Mention - Jagathy Sreekumar

References

External links 
 

2007 films
2000s Malayalam-language films